Garry David Bell (born 4 January 1952) is a former New Zealand cyclist, cycling administrator and coach.

Early life and family
Bell was born in Hamilton on 4 January 1952, the son of Jean Lois and George Lewis Bell, and was educated at Hamilton Boys' High School. In 1978, he married Jennifer Mary Hirst, and the couple went on to have two children.

Cycling career   
Bell represented New Zealand internationally in road cycling from 1973 to 1980. At the 1974 British Commonwealth Games in Christchurch, he finished fifth in the men's road race. At the 1976 Summer Olympics in Montreal, he was 15th in the men's road race, and at the 1978 Commonwealth Games in Edmonton, he won the bronze medal in the men's road race. Bell also raced for New Zealand at the World Cycling Championships between 1975 and 1979.

Beginning in 1982, Bell was active as a cycling selector and coach. He coached the New Zealand cycling team at the 1990 Commonwealth Games, the 1990 World Championships, the 1992 Summer Olympics, the 1994 Commonwealth Games, and 2000 Summer Olympics.

In 1990, Bell was awarded the New Zealand 1990 Commemoration Medal.

References

Further reading
 Black Gold by Ron Palenski (2008, 2004 New Zealand Sports Hall of Fame, Dunedin) p. 20 

1952 births
Living people
Sportspeople from Hamilton, New Zealand
People educated at Hamilton Boys' High School
New Zealand male cyclists
Olympic cyclists of New Zealand
Cyclists at the 1976 Summer Olympics
Commonwealth Games bronze medallists for New Zealand
Cyclists at the 1974 British Commonwealth Games
Cyclists at the 1978 Commonwealth Games
Commonwealth Games medallists in cycling
New Zealand sports coaches
New Zealand Olympic coaches
New Zealand sports executives and administrators
20th-century New Zealand people
Medallists at the 1978 Commonwealth Games